The second season of the American political drama series Designated Survivor was ordered on May 11, 2017. It premiered on September 27, 2017, and consisted of 22 episodes. The series is produced by ABC Studios and The Mark Gordon Company, and is filmed in Toronto and Cambridge, Ontario, Canada.

Premise
Beginning one year into office, President Thomas Kirkman juggles searching for the mastermind behind the attack on the Capitol Building, dealing with the day-to-day situations that take place at home and abroad, and surviving attacks against his administration.

Cast and characters

Main
 Kiefer Sutherland as President Thomas "Tom" Kirkman
 Natascha McElhone as First Lady Alexandra "Alex" Kirkman
 Paulo Costanzo as White House Political Director Lyor Boone
 Adan Canto as National Security Advisor Aaron Shore
 Italia Ricci as White House Chief of Staff Emily Rhodes
 LaMonica Garrett as United States Secret Service Special Agent, Mike Ritter; head of President Kirkman's Secret Service protection detail
 Zoe McLellan as White House Counsel Kendra Daynes
 Ben Lawson as Secret Intelligence Service (MI6) Intelligence Officer, Damian Rennett
 Kal Penn as White House Press Secretary Seth Wright
 Maggie Q as Federal Bureau of Investigation (FBI) Special Agent Hannah Wells

Recurring
 Terry Serpico as Patrick Lloyd, the man behind the Capitol attack 
 Jake Epstein as Chuck Russink, an FBI tech expert and Wells' partner 
 Tanner Buchanan as Leo Kirkman, the President's son
 Mckenna Grace as Penny Kirkman, the President's daughter
 Reed Diamond as FBI Director John Foerstel
 Geoff Pierson as Secretary of State and former President Cornelius Moss
 Mykelti Williamson as Vice Chairman Admiral Chernow
 Kim Raver as Andrea Frost, aerospace engineer, tech billionaire, friend of Kirkman's
 Breckin Meyer as Trey Kirkman, the President's brother
 Aunjanue Ellis as Mayor, later Vice President Ellenor Darby
 Bonnie Bedelia as Eva Booker
 Michael J. Fox as Ethan West
 Nora Zehetner as Valeria Poriskova, Russian intelligence agent

Guest
 Tim Busfield as Dr. Adam Louden, the President's therapist
 Chris Butler as Dax Minter, electric car company executive and anti-government hacker

Episodes

Production
Designated Survivor was renewed for a second season on May 11, 2017. Former The Good Wife executive producer Keith Eisner will take over as showrunner for the second season. Eisner will be the fourth showrunner for the show, replacing Jeff Melvoin, who was hired as showrunner in December 2016, taking over for Jon Harmon Feldman. The show's original showrunner Amy B. Harris stepped down due to creative differences after the series' official pickup in February 2016. 

On June 22, 2017, cast member Virginia Madsen announced that she would not be returning for the second season as Kimble Hookstraten as she commented "I guess they had other stories to tell. It's a big show so I wish them well." After the first-season finale, Sutherland announced that the show would add three new characters for the second season. Two of the character descriptions was "a "fiery" female White House Counsel and a "ruggedly handsome" MI6 operative who crosses paths with Hannah." TVLine announced on June 29, 2017, that Paulo Costanzo had been cast as a series regular role as Lyor Boone, the new White House Political Director. Deadline reported on July 17, 2017, that Ben Lawson had been cast as the series regular character Damian Rennett, an MI6 operative. In the same month, it was announced that Zoe McLellan was cast in a series regular role as attorney and White House counsel, Kendra Daynes. In November 2017, Kim Raver was cast in the recurring role of engineer and space entrepreneur, Andrea Frost. In January 2018, Michael J. Fox was cast in the recurring role of Washington attorney and special prosecutor, Ethan West. In March 2018, Nora Zehetner was cast in the recurring role of Russian cultural attaché, Valeria Poriskova.

Ratings

References

External links
 

2017 American television seasons
2018 American television seasons
Season 2